Unchalli Falls, also known as Lushington Falls, is a waterfall created by a  drop in the River Aghanashini. The falls are named for J. D. Lushington, a District Collector for the British Government, who discovered the falls in 1845.

The falls are sometimes called Keppa Joga because of the deafening sound they make.

Location 

See also
List of waterfalls in India

References

Waterfalls of Karnataka
Tourist attractions in Uttara Kannada district
Geography of Uttara Kannada district